Maryland Route 610 (MD 610) is a state highway in the U.S. state of Maryland.  Known for most of its length as Whaleyville Road, the state highway runs  from the county-maintained portion of Dale Road near Whaleyville north to U.S. Route 113 (US 113) near Bishop.  The first segment of MD 610 was constructed near Whaleyville in the mid-1930s.  The highway to Bishop was brought into the state highway system in the 1940s.  MD 610, which did not originally reach US 50, was extended south to that highway, now MD 346, in 1955.  The state highway reached its current southern terminus after the US 50 divided highway was constructed in the mid-1960s.

Route description

The state highway heads north from the intersection with US 50 as two-lane undivided Whaleyville Road. After crossing MD 346 (Old Ocean City Boulevard), MD 610 bypasses the center of Whaleyville on the west and intersects Sheppards Crossing Road. The state highway curves to the northeast and crosses Shavox Church Road and Peerless Road as well as Birch Branch on the way to its eastern terminus at US 113 (Worcester Highway) in Bishop. Hammond Road, which for a short stretch is unsigned MD 575L, continues east on the other side of the intersection toward Bishopville.

History
The first segment of MD 610 was constructed from Sheppards Crossing Road to Donaway Road north of Whaleyville in 1935. It was connected to US 213 (later US 50 and now MD 346) by Sheppards Crossing Road, which was improved by the Maryland State Roads Commission by 1934.  By 1946, state maintenance was extended east to Campbelltown Road near Bishop.  The segment between Campbelltown Road and US 113 was brought under state maintenance in 1950.  In 1955, MD 610 was extended south along a new alignment from Sheppards Crossing Road to present day MD 346.  The state highway was extended south again in 1966 to both connect with the new US 50 divided highway and to access properties on Dale Road, whose original alignment had been interrupted by the relocation of US 50.

Junction list

See also

References

External links

MDRoads: MD 610

610
Maryland Route 610